Hou Zong-Sheng was a writer in Chinese language. Born in Fuzhou, China, her given name Zong-Sheng was named after the alternative name of the city: Rong. During the Chinese Civil War, she migrated to Taiwan from the mainland China in 1949. She then studied in the University of Santo Tomas in the 1960s and then migrated to the United States.

Early life
Hou's ancestral home was located in Wuqing, Hebei Province (now belongs to Tianjin, a direct-controlled municipality). However, she was born in Fuzhou, Fujian province and spent her childhood in Beijing, Hebei Province (now also a direct-controlled municipality). She was graduated from Fu Jen Catholic University, before the university was relocated from Beijing to Taiwan.

Selected works

References

External links
 

Taiwanese writers
1926 births
1990 deaths
20th-century Chinese writers
20th-century Taiwanese writers